Vista Global Holding Limited is a private aviation group based in Dubai. It was founded in 2018 by Thomas Flohr.

Overview 
Vista was launched on September 20, 2018 with support from the global private equity firm, Rhône. Rhône invested an additional $200 million in September 2018. Vista became the parent company of VistaJet, a global business aviation company that Flohr founded in 2004. A week after Vista's launch, it acquired the on-demand private jet company, XOJET.

In April 2019, Vista acquired JetSmarter, a technology-enabled service provider specializing in the aviation industry, and in June, it merged XOJET with JetSmarter and rebranded the companies as XO.

By 2020, Vista acquired Red Wing Aviation, Apollo Jet, and Talon Air. 

In February 2022, Vista acquired Air Hamburg, the largest private jet operator with the highest number of flights across Europe. In March, it acquired Jet Edge, a private global aviation in North America, based on fractional and charter flight hours. Over 800 Jet Edge employees also joined Vista.

In April 2022, Fitch Ratings assigned Vista Global's $500 million notes a final BB- rating with a Recovery Rating of RR3.

References 

Companies based in Dubai
2018 establishments in the United Arab Emirates